Sir Hubert Craddock Stevenson, KCMG, OBE, MC (1888 – 13 June 1971) was a British colonial administrator. He was Governor of Sierra Leone from 1941 to 1947.

References 

 https://www.ukwhoswho.com/view/10.1093/ww/9780199540891.001.0001/ww-9780199540884-e-159912

1888 births
1971 deaths
Knights Commander of the Order of St Michael and St George
Governors of Sierra Leone
Officers of the Order of the British Empire
Recipients of the Military Cross
Colonial Administrative Service officers